"Malas Compañías" (Bad companies) is the second studio album of the Spanish singer-songwriter Joaquín Sabina, which was released under CBS, in 1980. Sabina started working in this new album short after the release of his previous album, Inventario, two years before.

Background 
After leaving Movieplay, his former record label and signing with CBS, Sabina started departing from the vindictive tone of the songs of his previous album and started focusing on other themes and other stories that would be part of the singer's personal style. When the recording of this album started in Madrid, the performer began collaborating with new producers and artists such as José Luis de Carlos, the renowned Hilario Camacho and José Antonio Romero.

Style 
The lyrics of Joaquín Sabina, in this second album, started focusing on usual stories and personal feelings. The opening track and the first maxi single from this album was "Calle melancolía" (Melancholy street), a song which revolves about feelings of loneliness and depression. Although this song would have a moderate success during that time, it later turned into one of the most widely remembered songs of Sabina's trajectory. The following track of this album, which had the title of "Que demasiao" (Really too much?) told the sad story and troubled life of a criminal known as "El Jaro".

In general, musically, the melodical sounds would prevail in this album, such is the main characteristic of the following maxi single and probably the most popular one of this release, "Pongamos que hablo de Madrid" (Let's say I'm talking about Madrid) a song that was originally written by Sabina but which had been previously recorded by Antonio Flores, whose version reached the number one position of the Los 40 Principales chart. The B side of that Maxi single was the song "Círculos viciosos" (Vicious circles) a more cheerful rhumba composed by Chicho Sánchez Ferlosio.

The melodical sounds of this album continue until the ending track entitled "Pasándolo bien" (having a good time), which had a more accelerated rhythm with less presence of acoustic instruments and more electronic vibes.

Track listing

Reception 
Unlike "Inventario", his previous release that only sold one thousand copies, Malas Compañías received a better welcome both critically and commercially. Thanks to this album and to the moderate success of the two maxi singles extracted from it, the performer started gaining media exposure. Eight years after the release of this album, CBS re-released it due to Sabina's growing popularity.

References

External links 
 Malas Compañías in Joaquín Sabina's official website.

1978 albums
Joaquín Sabina albums